Knut Börje Stattin (13 February 1930 – 4 April 2020) was a Swedish gymnast. He competed in all gymnastics events at the 1952 Summer Olympics with the best individual result of 32nd place on horizontal bar.

References

External links
 

1930 births
2020 deaths
Swedish male artistic gymnasts
Olympic gymnasts of Sweden
Gymnasts at the 1952 Summer Olympics
People from Gävle
Sportspeople from Gävleborg County